Rhipidarctia postrosea is a moth in the family Erebidae. It was described by Walter Rothschild in 1913. It is found in Cameroon, the Democratic Republic of the Congo, Ghana and Nigeria.

References

Moths described in 1913
Syntomini